Dustin Lancy Farnum (May 27, 1874 – July 3, 1929) was an American singer, dancer, and actor on the stage and in silent films. Although he played a wide variety of roles, he tended toward westerns and became one of the biggest stars of the genre.

Biography
He was born the eldest of three boys on May 27, 1874, in Hampton Beach, New Hampshire, the older brother of actor William Farnum, whom he closely resembled, and the lesser known silent film director Marshall Farnum (died 1917). He married Mary Cromwell in 1909 and they divorced in 1924. He then married Winifred Kingston; they were the parents of radio actress Estelle "Dustine" Runyon (1925–1983). After great success in a number of stage roles, Farnum landed his first film role in 1914 in the movie Soldiers of Fortune, and later in Cecil B. DeMille's The Squaw Man.

Death
He died of kidney failure on July 3, 1929 at Post Graduate Hospital in Manhattan, aged 55.

Filmography

Soldiers of Fortune (1914)
The Squaw Man (1914)
The Lightning Conductor (1914)
The Virginian (1914)
When We Were Young (1914)
Cameo Kirby (1914)
Captain Courtesy (1915)
The Iron Strain (1916)
The Gentleman from Indiana (1916)
The Call of the Cumberlands (1916)
Ben Blair (1916)
 David Garrick (1916)
Davy Crockett (1916)
The Parson of Panamint (1916)
The Intrigue (1916)
A Son of Erin (1916)
Durand of the Bad Lands (1917)
 The Spy (1917)
North of Fifty Three (1917)
The Scarlet Pimpernel (1917)
Ready Money Ringfield (1918)
The Light of Western Stars (1918)
A Man in the Open (1919)
A Man's Fight (1919)
 The Corsican Brothers (1920)
Big Happiness (1921)
The Primal Law (1921)
The Devil Within (1921)
Iron to Gold (1922)
Strange Idols (1922)
 Oath-Bound (1922)
Trail of the Axe (1922)
 The Yosemite Trail (1922)
While Justice Waits (1922)
Three Who Paid (1923)
The Buster (1923)
Bucking the Barrier (1923)
The Man Who Won (1923)
The Grail (1923)
 Kentucky Days (1923)
 My Man (1924)
The Flaming Frontier (1926)

Broadway plays

A Romance of Athlone (January 29, 1900 – March 3, 1900)
Marcelle (October 1900)
More Than Queen (October 30, 1900 – November 1900)
The Virginian (Boston October 1903, New York January 5, 1904 – May 1904)
The Ranger (September 1907)
The Rector's Garden (March 1908)
Cameo Kirby (December 20, 1909 – January 1910)
The Silent Call (January 1911)
The Squaw Man (January 9, 1911 – January 17, 1911)
The Littlest Rebel (November 14, 1911 – January 1912)
Arizona (April 28, 1913 – June 1913)

Legacy
According to an interview in the April 1975 edition of Playboy, Dustin Hoffman was named after Farnum. Additionally, according to an interview on Fresh Air with Terry Gross on NPR, on January 16, 2013, Dustin says his parents were expecting him to be a girl and did not have a boy's name picked out for him. When his mother did have another boy, and was pressured to give him a name, she picked the name Dustin from a magazine the other lady in her room was reading, which featured Dustin Farnum on the cover.

References

External links

Dustin Farnum at the British Film Institute
Literature on Dustin Farnum

1874 births
1929 deaths
American male silent film actors
American male film actors
Vaudeville performers
People from Hampton, New Hampshire
Male actors from New Hampshire
Singers from New Hampshire
American male stage actors
19th-century American male singers
19th-century American singers
American male dancers
Male Western (genre) film actors
Deaths from kidney failure
20th-century American male actors